The mixed doubles badminton event at the 2022 Commonwealth Games was held from 3 to 8 August 2022 at the National Exhibition Centre on the Solihull, England. The defending gold medalists were Chris Adcock and Gabby Adcock of England. The Adcocks did not defend their title, due to their retirement.

The athletes were drawn into straight knockout stage. The draw for the competition was conducted on 28 July 2022.

Seeds 

The seeds for the tournament were:

  (Semi-finals, Bronze medalists)
  (final, Silver medalists)
  (champions, Gold medalists)
  (Semi-finals, fourth place)

  (quarter-finals)
  (quarter-finals)
  (quarter-finals)
  (quarter-finals)

Results

Finals

Top Half

Section 1

Section 2

Bottom Half

Section 3

Section 4

References 

Mixed doubles